Arene guyanensis is a species of sea snail, a marine gastropod mollusk in the family Areneidae.

References

External links

Areneidae
Gastropods described in 2018